Bodied is the sixth studio album by English electronic musician Ital Tek. It was released on 7 September 2018, under Planet Mu.

Critical reception
Bodied was met with "generally favorable" reviews from critics. At Metacritic, which assigns a weighted average rating out of 100 to reviews from mainstream publications, this release received an average score of 77, based on 7 reviews. Aggregator Album of the Year gave the release a 79 out of 100 based on a critical consensus of 5 reviews.

Accolades

Track listing

References

2018 albums
Planet Mu albums